Mihai Viteazu (archaic: Sânmihaiu;) is a commune in Cluj County, Transylvania, Romania. It is composed of three villages: Cheia (Mészkő), Cornești (Sinfalva), and Mihai Viteazu.

Mihai Viteazu village, which is named after the medieval ruler Michael the Brave (Romanian: Mihai Viteazu), was founded in 1925 by the merging of two villages, Sânmihaiu de Jos (Alsószentmihály) and Sânmihaiu de Sus (Felsőszentmihály). Those two, together with Cornești and Cheia, were first mentioned in documents in the 14th century, after the settlement of Székelys in the Aranyos Seat area. However, archaeologists unearthed traces of human dwellings from earlier periods, too. 

The most interesting sight of the area is the Turda Gorge (Cheile Turzii).

Demography
At the 2002 census, 71.2% of the commune's inhabitants were Romanians, 27.4% Hungarians and 1.3% Roma. 66.6% were Romanian Orthodox, 13.8% Unitarian, 10.1% Reformed, 4% Roman Catholic, 2.4% belonged to another religion, and 0.9% Pentecostal.

Natives
Ion Cârja (1922–1977), anti-Communist dissident, writer
Oliviu Gherman (1930–2020), physicist and politician

References

Atlasul localităților județului Cluj (Cluj County Localities Atlas), Suncart Publishing House, Cluj-Napoca,

External links
 Homepage of the village

Communes in Cluj County
Localities in Transylvania